Arvo Aller (born 28 July 1973) is an Estonian politician. He served as Ministry of Rural Affairs in the second cabinet of Prime Minister Jüri Ratas from 10 December 2019 to 26 January 2021. Urmas Kruuse was appointed as his successor. He is affiliated with the Conservative People's Party of Estonia (EKRE).

References 

1973 births
21st-century Estonian politicians
Agriculture ministers of Estonia
Conservative People's Party of Estonia politicians
Government ministers of Estonia
Living people
Members of the Riigikogu, 2023–2027
People from Kohtla-Järve
Tallinn University of Technology alumni